Aylton Ferreira Ananias (born 22 April 1988), known as Aylton Alemão, is a Brazilian footballer who plays as a center-back for Kuching City.

Career
Born in Mogi das Cruzes, Aylton spent most of his playing career with clubs based in Alagoas and Pernambuco states. He has played in Brazil with Salgueiro Atlético Clube, Esporte Clube Primeiro Passo Vitória da Conquista, Associação Desportiva Cabofriense, Central and Agremiação Sportiva Arapiraquense, and in Oman with Seeb Club.

Aylton scored a goal for Salgueiro in an aggregate 1–4 defeat to Botofogo-PB in the semi-finals of 2013 Campeonato Brasileiro Série D, helping the club qualify for 2014 Campeonato Brasileiro Série C.

References

External links
Profile at Soccerway

1988 births
Living people
Brazilian footballers
Campinense Clube players
Salgueiro Atlético Clube players
Associação Desportiva Cabofriense players
Agremiação Sportiva Arapiraquense players
Khaitan SC players
Al-Seeb Club players
Brazilian expatriate footballers
Kuching City F.C. players
Expatriate footballers in Kuwait
Brazilian expatriate sportspeople in Kuwait
Expatriate footballers in Oman
Brazilian expatriate sportspeople in Oman
Association football central defenders
Kuwait Premier League players
Brazilian expatriate sportspeople in Malaysia
Expatriate footballers in Malaysia
People from Mogi das Cruzes
Footballers from São Paulo (state)